Horse Creek is a  long 2nd order tributary to the Little River in Hoke County, North Carolina.

Course
Horse Creek rises on the Flat Creek divide about 2 miles south of Inverness in Hoke County, North Carolina.  Horse Creek then flows northeasterly to meet the Little River about 2 miles southwest of Mt. Pleasant.

Watershed
Horse Creek drains  of area, receives about 47.9 in/year of precipitation, has a topographic wetness index of 436.46 and is about 65% forested.

References

Rivers of North Carolina
Rivers of Hoke County, North Carolina